Dictionary of the Contemporary Arabic Language is a 2008 dictionary aiming to cover modern Arabic. It was authored by Ahmed Mukhtar Omar.

References

Arabic dictionaries
2008 non-fiction books
21st-century Arabic books